Panhalakaji Caves are situated in the Ratnagiri district of Maharashtra state, about 160 km south of Mumbai. This cave complex has around 30 Buddhist caves. The Hinayana sect began carving caves in 3rd century AD, beginning with the stupa in the current Cave 5. The caves have inscriptions in Dhamma and Devanagari script. In the 10-11th century AD another Buddhist group, a Vajrayana sect, established cave 10 with their deities Akshobhya and Mahachandaroshana; and strengthened their practice in that region. Shiva and Ganpatya worshiping started at the site during Silahara rule. There are total 29 caves out of which 28 are situated on the right bank of mou tain stream Kotjai.

A list of important caves includes:
Cave 10 has and image of Maha-Chandraroshana. This deity is shown on the stupa which signifies the connection of Ratnagiri with ancient Buddhist sites of Orissa.
Cave 14 has deities of Nath Pantha.
Cave 19 has shivlinga in it. It has Hindu scriptures on its ceiling.
Cave 29 was used by Nath Pantha and was renamed as Gaur Lena.

How to reach
By train: Nearest Rail station is Khed, Ratnagiri.
By road:  Located on NH 4 highway near Dapoli.

Further reading

References

External links

 Map of Panhalakaji Caves

Buddhist caves in India
Caves of Maharashtra
Indian rock-cut architecture
Former populated places in India
Buddhist pilgrimage sites in India
Caves containing pictograms in India
Tourist attractions in Ratnagiri district